The Pitti Tondo (Tondo Pitti) is a marble relief of the Virgin and Child by Michelangelo in round or tondo form. It was made between 1503 and 1504 and is now in the Museo nazionale del Bargello in Florence.

History
The tondo was made in the year in which Michelangelo sculpted his David, having found the time to dedicate to some other paid private commissions. This work was made for Bartolomeo Pitti. His son Miniato, a monk at Monte Oliveto, donated it to Luigi Guicciardini (1487–1551). Benedetto Varchi saw the work in 1564, in the house of his nephew Piero.

In 1823, the tondo was bought by the Florentine authorities for 200 scudi, from the shop of the dealer Fedele Acciai. Placed in the Galleria degli Uffizi, it finally came to the Museo nazionale del Bargello in 1873.

Description and style
In the tondo, Mary is visible, with an open book on her knees. With a distracted gaze, she looks into the distance as if meditating on the fate of her son in the scriptures. The baby Jesus leans on her in a lively contrapposto, and in the background is just visible a young Saint John the Baptist. 

Surely Michelangelo was influenced by the lost cartoon of Saint Anne by Leonardo da Vinci, which was exhibited at the Santissima Annunziata in those years, based on the interaction between the figures and the bound atmosphere created with the stiacciato technique. The sides of the work are not polished, giving an unfinished character to the work, and accentuating this effect.

The center of the entire composition is Mary, sitting on a cube block (like Madonna of the Stairs) and seeming to bend over to better enter the space of the tondo. It almost gives the impression that she wants to leave forcefully leave the field of the relief. Her head, in high relief, projects both outwards and upwards beyond the border of the tondo and turns left to break the rigidity of the vertical axis of her body. The contrast between the figure of John the Baptist and the relief of the Virgin also gives the work depth.

See also
List of works by Michelangelo
Taddei Tondo

References

Bibliography

External links
 http://www.polomuseale.firenze.it/catalogo/scheda.asp?nctn=00286603&value=

Sculptures by Michelangelo
1504 works
1503 works
16th-century sculptures
Marble sculptures in Italy
Virgin Mary in art
Sculptures of the Bargello